The 2002 OFC Nations Cup was an international football tournament that was held in Auckland, New Zealand from 5 to 14 July 2002. The 8 national teams involved in the tournament were required to register a squad of players; only players in these squads were eligible to take part in the tournament. An initial six-team qualifying phase took place in Samoa from 9 to 18 March 2002 allowing the top two, New Caledonia and Papua New Guinea, to move on and join Australia, Fiji, New Zealand, Solomon Islands, Tahiti and Vanuatu at the main tournament.

Players marked (c) were named as captain for their national squad. Players' club teams and players' age are as of 5 July 2002 – the tournament's opening day.

Group A

Australia
Coach: Frank Farina

Fiji
Coach: Billy Singh

New Caledonia
Coach:  Serge Martinengo de Novack

Vanuatu
Coach:  Juan Carlos Buzzetti

Group B

New Zealand
Coach:  Mick Waitt

Papua New Guinea
Coach:  Steve Cain

Solomon Islands
Coach:  George Cowie

Tahiti
Coach: Patrick Jacquemet

Player representation

By club nationality 

Nations in italics are not represented by their national teams in the finals.

By representatives of domestic league

References

squads
OFC Nations Cup squads